74 Armoured Regiment is an armoured regiment of the Indian Army.

Formation 
The 74 Armoured Regiment was raised on 1 June 1972 at Ahmednagar by Lieutenant Colonel KS Khajuria. The class composition of the regiment is Sikhs, Ahirs and Dogras.

History 
The Regiment was presented the President's Standard on 27 November 2011 by the then President of India Mrs Prathiba Patil. 74 Armoured Regiment along with four other Armoured Regiments of the 1 Armoured Division were presented with the colours in Patiala.

Equipment
The Regiment is presently equipped with the T-90 tanks.

Operations
It has participated in all major operations since it formation and has been awarded one Shaurya Chakra, four Sena Medals and 38 Commendation Cards.

Regimental Insignia
The Regimental badge comprises a tank hull with a mailed fist on it representing the 'weapon' and the  'punch of armour'. The numeral "74" is inscribed on the hull. The hull with track rests on a wave with the Regimental motto 'विजय या वीरगति' ('Vijay Ya Veergati', which means Victory or Martyrdom) engraved on it. 
The colours of the Regiment are Steel Grey and Blood Red.

Notable servicemen
The author Lt Col Rohit Agarwal was commissioned into 74 Armoured Regiment in 1989.

References

Military units and formations established in 1972
Armoured and cavalry regiments of the Indian Army from 1947